There is a small number of Serbs in Slovakia, mostly located in the southern town of Komárno, where they have been living since the 17th century. There has also been a historic minority in Bratislava (Požun), where many Habsburg Serbs studied. The number of Slovaks of Serb descent is hard to determine but nevertheless they are recognized as an official minority.

Demographics
The Association of Serbs in Slovakia claim that 2,784 Serbs, born outside Slovakia, currently live in Slovakia, while another 800 Slovaks are of Serb descent. However, at the 2011 census, only 698 people claimed the Serbian ethnicity.

Notable people
Branko Radivojevič, Slovak ice hockey player of Serb parentage
Marko Milinković, Serbian expatriate football player
Slaven Dizdarević, Slovak Serb decathlete.
Gavril Stefanović Venclović, Serb priest, writer, poet, orator, philosopher, and illuminator.
Pavle Davidović, Serb general, Knight of the Military Order of Maria Theresa.

See also

 Serbia-Slovakia relations
 Slovaks of Serbia

References

Sources

Svaki drugi Srbin zivi izvan Srbije

 
Ethnic groups in Slovakia
Slovakia
 
Slovakia
Slovakia
Slovakia
Slovakia